Rathconrath, previously the barony of Rathcomyrta, before that Daltons country, is a barony in the west of County Westmeath, in the Republic of Ireland. It was formed by 1542. It is bordered by County Longford to the north–west and five other Westmeath baronies: Moygoish to the north, Moyashel and Magheradernon to the east, Moycashel and Clonlonan to the south and Kilkenny West to the west. Note that the village of Rathconrath is not synonymous with the barony of the same name.

Geography

Civil parishes of the barony
This table lists an historical geographical sub-division of the barony known as the civil parish (not to be confused with an Ecclesiastical parish).

Villages and townlands

Ballymore, a village on the R390 regional road between Athlone and Mullingar
Dysart, a village on the R391 road
Loughnavalley, a village at the junction of the R389 and the R390 roads
Moyvore, a village on the R392 road
Moyvoughly, a small village
Rathconrath, a village on the R392 road, west of Mullingar

There are 162 townlands in the barony of Rathconrath.

Places of interest
Hill of Uisneach, an ancient ceremonial site consisting of a set of monuments and earthworks spread over two square kilometres, in folklore the centre of Ireland.

References

External links
Map of the barony of Rathconrath at openstreetmap.org
Barony of Rathconrath, County Westmeath at Townlands.ie

Baronies of County Westmeath